Jack Welsh may refer to:

 Jack Welsh (footballer, born 1924) (1924–2012), Australian rules footballer who played with Footscray in the Victorian Football League (VFL). His son Peter also played for Footscray.
 Jack Welsh (footballer, born 1906) (1906–1964), Australian rules footballer for North Melbourne

See also
 John Welsh (disambiguation)
 Jonathan Welsh (disambiguation)
 Jack Welch (disambiguation)